Laajasalon Palloseura (abbreviated LPS) is a football club from Laajasalo, Helsinki in Finland.  The club was formed in 1978 and their home ground is at the Laajasalon urheilupuisto.  The men's first team currently plays in the Kolmonen (Third Division).  The Chairman of LPS is Timo Viheriäranta.

Background
The club held their inaugural meeting on 11 September 1978 and 14 people attended who were interested in football.  For the early part of their history LPS spent many seasons in the lower divisions of the Finnish football league. In 2003 LPS won their Kolmonen section and subsequently have played 7 consecutive seasons in the Kakkonen (Second Division), the third tier of Finnish football from 2004 to the present day.  The most successful season was in 2007 when LPS finished fourth in their section.

Season to season

Club Structure
LPS currently has 3 men's teams for competitive soccer and 2 men's teams for hobbysoccer. For women LPS has one competitive soccer team and one team for hobbysoccer.
In addition there is a junior section with 8 boys teams and 3 girls teams providing football for approximately 300 youngsters.  The club runs a partseason soccer school at summer and a school for juniors to improve their soccerskills.

The most successful junior team is the B93 -team that plays at the second highest level in Finland, in 1st Division (B-poikien ykkönen) starting autumn 2010.

Kuninkaat
The second ranked men's team is Kuninkaat who currently play under the flag of LPS.  The team have excelled at futsal.

2010 season
LPS Men's Team are competing in Group A (Lohko A) of the Kakkonen administered by the Football Association of Finland  (Suomen Palloliitto) .  This is the third highest tier in the Finnish football system.  In 2009 Laajasalon Palloseura finished in tenth position in their Kakkonen section.

LPS / Kuninkaat are participating in Section 2 (Lohko 2) of the Nelonen (Fourth Division) administered by the Helsinki SPL.

LPS / 2 are participating in Section 4 (Lohko 4) of the Kutonen (Sixth Division) administered by the Helsinki SPL.  In 2009 LPS/2 were relegated from their Vitonen (Fifth Division) section.

Current Squad for the 2012 season

References and sources
Official Website
Kuninkaat Website
Laajasalon Palloseura 2 Website
Finnish Wikipedia
Suomen Cup
 Laajasalon Palloseura (LPS) Facebook
 Kuninkaat Facebook
 Laajasalon Palloseura Fan Club Ultras Facebook

Footnotes

Football clubs in Helsinki
1978 establishments in Finland